Flávio Henrique Esteves Guedes or simply Flávio (born 5 March 1985 in Teófilo Otoni, Brazil), is an association football goalkeeper who currently plays for Cruzeiro reserve team.

Honours
Cruzeiro
Minas Gerais State League: 2006

Contract
Cabofriense (Loan) 5 December 2007 to 31 December 2008
Cruzeiro 15 February 2006 to 14 February 2011
Oeste (Loan) January 2011 to May 2011
Luverdense (Loan) May 2011 to November 2011

External links
 CBF
 sambafoot
 zerozero.pt
 Guardian Stats Centre

1985 births
Living people
Brazilian footballers
Cruzeiro Esporte Clube players
Oeste Futebol Clube players
Associação Desportiva Cabofriense players
Association football goalkeepers